Duga Poljana may refer to:
 Duga Poljana (Gadžin Han), a village in Gadžin Han, Serbia
 Duga Poljana (Sjenica), a village in Sjenica, Serbia